The Schlern (2,563 m) is a mountain of the Dolomites in South Tyrol, Italy.
The peak at the north west end of the mountain (left, in the image at right) was first ascended in July 1880 by Johann Santner.  It is named the Santner Spitze in his honour.

The Schlern dominates the villages of Seis am Schlern and Völs am Schlern, and the summit can be reached following the circular route marked with the number 1 from both villages.

At , there is the Schlernboden inn and on the summit plateau is the Schlernhaus inn , both open from 1 June to 15 October.

The Schlern is sung of in the Bozner Bergsteigerlied as one of South Tyrol's landmarks. Its characteristic profile appears on the Der Schlern - Zeitschrift für Südtiroler Landeskunde (Magazine for South Tyrolean Regional Studies) and the logo pressed into Loacker's wafer biscuits.

Gallery

External links

 Schlern article from summitpost.org

Mountains of the Alps
Mountains of South Tyrol
Dolomites